49th New York Film Critics Circle Awards
January 29, 1984

Best Film: 
 Terms of Endearment 
The 49th New York Film Critics Circle Awards honored the best filmmaking of 1983. The winners were announced on 21 December 1983 and the awards were given on 29 January 1984.

Winners
Best Actor:
Robert Duvall - Tender Mercies
Runner-up: Gérard Depardieu - Danton and The Return of Martin Guerre (Le retour de Martin Guerre)
Best Actress:
Shirley MacLaine - Terms of Endearment
Runner-up: Debra Winger - Terms of Endearment
Best Cinematography:
Gordon Willis - Zelig
Best Director:
Ingmar Bergman - Fanny and Alexander (Fanny och Alexander)
Runner-up: Philip Kaufman - The Right Stuff
Best Film:
Terms of Endearment
Runners-up: The Right Stuff and Silkwood
Best Foreign Language Film:
Fanny and Alexander (Fanny och Alexander) • Sweden
Best Screenplay:
Bill Forsyth - Local Hero
Runner-up: James L. Brooks - Terms of Endearment
Best Supporting Actor:
Jack Nicholson - Terms of Endearment
Runner-up: Ed Harris - The Right Stuff
Best Supporting Actress:
Linda Hunt - The Year of Living Dangerously
Runner-up: Cher - Silkwood

References

External links
1983 Awards

1983
New York Film Critics Circle Awards, 1983
New York Film Critics Circle Awards
New York Film Critics Circle Awards
New York Film Critics Circle Awards
New York Film Critics Circle Awards